In mathematical physics, spacetime algebra (STA) is a name for the Clifford algebra Cl1,3(R), or equivalently the geometric algebra . According to David Hestenes, spacetime algebra can be particularly closely associated with the geometry of special relativity and relativistic spacetime.

It is a vector space that allows not only vectors, but also bivectors (directed quantities associated with particular planes, such as areas, or rotations) or blades (quantities associated with particular hyper-volumes) to be combined, as well as rotated, reflected, or Lorentz boosted.  It is also the natural parent algebra of spinors in special relativity.  These properties allow many of the most important equations in physics to be expressed in particularly simple forms, and can be very helpful towards a more geometric understanding of their meanings.

Structure
The spacetime algebra may be built up from an orthogonal basis of one time-like vector  and three space-like vectors, with the multiplication rule

where  is the Minkowski metric with signature .

Thus, otherwise .

The basis vectors  share these properties with the Dirac matrices, but no explicit matrix representation need be used in STA.

This generates a basis of one scalar , four vectors , six bivectors , four pseudovectors  and one pseudoscalar , where .

Reciprocal frame
Associated with the orthogonal basis  is the reciprocal basis  for 
, satisfying the relation

Spacetime gradient

The spacetime gradient, like the gradient in a Euclidean space, is defined such that the directional derivative relationship is satisfied:

This requires the definition of the gradient to be

Spacetime split

In spacetime algebra, a spacetime split is a projection from four-dimensional space into (3+1)-dimensional space with a chosen reference frame by means of the following two operations:
 a collapse of the chosen time axis, yielding a 3D space spanned by bivectors, and
 a projection of the 4D space onto the chosen time axis, yielding a 1D space of scalars.
This is achieved by pre- or post-multiplication by the timelike basis vector , which serves to split a four vector into a scalar timelike and a bivector spacelike component. With  we have

As these bivectors  square to unity, they serve as a spatial basis.  Utilizing the Pauli matrix notation, these are written .  Spatial vectors in STA are denoted in boldface; then with  the -spacetime split  and its reverse  are:

Multivector division
The spacetime algebra is not a division algebra, because it contains idempotent elements  and nonzero zero divisors: .  These can be interpreted as projectors onto the light-cone and orthogonality relations for such projectors, respectively.  But in some cases it is possible to divide one multivector quantity by another, and make sense of the result: so, for example, a directed area divided by a vector in the same plane gives another vector, orthogonal to the first.

Spacetime algebra description of non-relativistic physics

Non-relativistic quantum mechanics
Spacetime algebra allows the description of the Pauli particle in terms of a real theory in place of a matrix theory. The matrix theory description of the Pauli particle is:

In the spacetime algebra the Pauli particle is described by the real Pauli–Schrödinger equation:

Hestenes refers to this as the real Pauli–Schrödinger theory to emphasize that this theory reduces to the Schrödinger theory if the term that includes the magnetic field is dropped.

Spacetime algebra description of relativistic physics

Relativistic quantum mechanics
The relativistic quantum wavefunction is sometimes expressed as a spinor field, i.e.

where  is a bivector, and

This equation is interpreted as connecting spin with the imaginary pseudoscalar.  is viewed as a Lorentz rotation which a frame of vectors  into another frame of vectors  by the operation , where the tilde symbol indicates the reverse (the reverse is often also denoted by the dagger symbol, see also Rotations in geometric algebra).

This has been extended to provide a framework for locally varying vector- and scalar-valued observables and support for the Zitterbewegung interpretation of quantum mechanics originally proposed by Schrödinger.

where  is the classical action along the -path.

Spacetime algebra enables a description of the Dirac particle in terms of a real theory in place of a matrix theory. The matrix theory description of the Dirac particle is:

where  are the Dirac matrices. In the spacetime algebra the Dirac particle is described by the equation:

A new formulation of general relativity

Lasenby, Doran, and Gull of Cambridge University have proposed a new formulation of gravity, termed gauge theory gravity (GTG), wherein spacetime algebra is used to induce curvature on Minkowski space while admitting a gauge symmetry under "arbitrary smooth remapping of events onto spacetime" (Lasenby, et al.); a nontrivial derivation then leads to the geodesic equation,

and the covariant derivative

The theory shows some promise for the treatment of black holes, as its form of the Schwarzschild solution does not break down at singularities; most of the results of general relativity have been mathematically reproduced, and the relativistic formulation of classical electrodynamics has been extended to quantum mechanics and the Dirac equation.

See also
 Geometric algebra
 Dirac algebra
 Dirac equation
 General relativity

References

External links
 Imaginary numbers are not real – the geometric algebra of spacetime, a tutorial introduction to the ideas of geometric algebra, by S. Gull, A. Lasenby, C. Doran
 Physical Applications of Geometric Algebra course-notes, see especially part 2.
 Cambridge University Geometric Algebra group
 Geometric Calculus research and development

Geometric algebra
Clifford algebras
Minkowski spacetime
Mathematical physics